Tahoua Airport  is an airport serving Tahoua, Niger.

See also
Transport in Niger

References

   Great Circle Mapper - Tahoua
 Tahoua Airport
 Google Earth

External links
 OurAirports - Tahoua Airport

Airports in Niger